The Ministry of Defence (Ministerstvo na otbranata) of Bulgaria is the ministry charged with regulating the Bulgarian Armed Forces. It is Bulgaria's ministry of defence.

Since March 2022 the Minister of Defence is Dragomir Zakov.

The present building of the ministry is among the finest examples of the Bulgarian modern architecture from the middle of 20th century. It was designed by the famous Bulgarian architectural team Vasilyov-Tsolov and completed in the period 1939–45.

History 
The Ministry was created in 1879. Between 1911 and 1947 it was called Ministry of War (Министерство на войната, Ministerstvo na voynata) and from 1947 to 1990 it bore the name Ministry of People's Defence (Министерство на народната отбрана, Ministerstvo na narodnata otbrana).

Structure

Political Cabinet
The political cabinet assists the Minister of Defense in formulating and developing particular decisions for carrying out the governmental policy, and in representing that policy to society.
It consists of the deputy ministers, the head of the Minister's office, the parliamentary secretary and the Chief of the Public Relations unit. The work of the cabinet is assisted by experts.
There are currently two  Deputy Ministers serving office: Ivan Ivanov and Spas Panchev.

Secretary General

The Secretary General carries out the administrative leadership of the Ministry of Defense by implementing the legal orders issued by the Minister of Defense; it also leads, coordinates, and controls the functioning of the Ministry of Defense with respect to the strict observation of the laws and the sub-law acts, and reports to the Minister of Defense on the activities of the Ministry of Defense;
The Secretary General:
leads, coordinates and controls the circulation of documentation;
manages the accountability and the control over the preparation of orders and guidance of the Minister of Defense;
guides the process on the automation of the management of the Ministry of Defense;
organizes and is responsible for the keeping and managing of the real estate and portable items provided to and used by the Ministry of Defense.
approves the expenditures necessary for managing the Ministry of Defense;
develops the draft of the budget of the Ministry of Defense in its part related to the means necessary for the administrative support of the activities of the Ministry of Defense;
keeps track of legal and appropriate spending of the financial means and materiel provided for the Ministry of Defense;
prepares an annual report on the status of the administrative activities in the Ministry of Defense, which he presents to the Minister of the State's Administration after the report is approved by the Minister of Defense. 
The Minister of Defense's job within the Secretary General is that
he is responsible for the checking regime and security in the building of the Ministry of Defense;
he fulfills other tasks as well which are assigned to him by the Minister of Defense

Inspectorate
The Inspectorate to the Ministry of Defense provides the act of fulfilling the control functions on the part of the Minister of Defense in carrying out the state policy in the sphere of defense.
The Inspectorate makes examines and makes investigations with respect to:
observation of the laws and of the orders issued by the Minister of Defense;
observation of the order and discipline in the troops;
management and assigning of financial means and materiel;
personnel management;
preservation of the natural environment;
other checks assigned to the inspectorate by the Minister of Defense.
The Inspectorate is directly subordinated to the Minister of Defense and is headed by the Chief Inspector. It additionally studies the suggestions, signals, litigations and requests filed in by physical persons or legal entities to the Minister of Defense and prepares answers to the above-mentioned.
The organization of the activities of the inspectorate, the types of the checks as well as the conditions and the order of how to conduct them, are determined by the Minister of Defense.

General Administration
The general Administration of the Ministry of Defense is organized into directorates "Administrative and Financial Service" and "Financial-Economic Activities".

Specialized Administration
The specialized administration of the Ministry of Defense is organized into eleven directorates.
The specialized administration assists and provides for the realization of the rights of the Minister of Defense and of the deputy ministers of defense within the framework of the rights delegated to them and the functions they are assigned.
 
Directorate:
Defense policy directorate
Defense planning and programming directorate
International cooperation directorate
Budget planning and management directorate
Personnel policy directorate
Financial control activities directorate
Procurement management directorate
Military infrastructure directorate
Armaments and equipment policy directorate
Legal and regulatory affairs (LRA) directorate
Military Standardization, Quality and Codification Directorate

Officer on Security of Information
The officer on the security of the information is directly subordinated to the Minister of Defense and fulfills the tasks, which are assigned to him by virtue of the Law on the protection of the classified information and by the sub-law acts on the enforcement of the above-mentioned law.
In carrying out his functions, the officer on the security of information is assisted by a unit working on the security of the information.

Administrative Structures subordinated to the Ministry of Defense

Military information service
This functions as a 
military information service which is a legal entity supported by the budget - it is a secondary budget credit holder to the Minister of Defense;
military information service which acquires, processes, analyzes, keeps and provides information in the interest of defense and the national security of the Republic of Bulgaria;
this organizational structure of the service is approved by the Minister of Defense and its activities are defined by Regulations approved by the council of ministers.

Security - military police and military counterintelligence service
Its functions are as follows
The basic tasks of "Security - military police and military counterintelligence" service is to maintain the order and security in the Ministry of Defense and in the Bulgarian army.
Parallel to that it fulfills the following functions:
it provides for the protection of the Ministry of Defense and the Bulgarian army from activities of foreign special services, organizations and persons directed against the security of the Ministry of Defense and the Bulgarian army;
carries out activities aimed at maintaining the order in the Ministry of Defense and in the Bulgarian army for the prevention, revealing and investigation of crimes committed in the Ministry of Defense and in the Bulgarian army with view to finding out the perpetrators;
provides guarding and security of activities, sites and persons in the Ministry of Defense and in the Bulgarian army;
provides for the control over the observation of the rules for movement on the roads by the drivers of transport vehicles and organized groups of servicemen;
conducts activities pertaining to collecting, processing, storage, analyzing, using and providing information related to the maintenance of order and security in the Ministry of Defense and in the Bulgarian army.

The structure of the "Security - military police and military counterintelligence" service is built on territorial principle in accordance with the administrative-territorial division of the Republic of Bulgaria and with the existing organizational and position structure of the Bulgarian army.

List of ministers

References

External links
  

Defence
Bulgaria, Defence
Bulgaria
Military of Bulgaria
1879 establishments in Bulgaria
Bulgaria
Bulgaria